Boreaspis (meaning "Boreas' Shield") is an extinct genus of osteostracan agnathan vertebrate that lived in the Devonian period.

Fourteen different species of Boreaspis have been found in sandstone of the lagoons and estuaries of Devonian Spitsbergen; however, some of these likely do not belong to the genus. The species B. robusta and B. costata have been reassigned to Spatulaspis; and B. circinus, B. curtirostris, and B. gracilis now belong to Dicranaspis.

All species possessed a long spathe-like rostrum derived from the anterior-most end of the head shield, which would have enhanced the fish's hydrodynamics and was probably also used to root out food buried beneath the substrate.

References 

 

Osteostraci genera
Early Devonian fish of Europe
Pragian life
Emsian life